Semyon Denisovich Ignatyev (14 September 1904, Karlivka – 27 November 1983, Moscow) was a Soviet politician, and the last head of the security forces appointed by Joseph Stalin.

Early career
Ignatyev, the son of a peasant family of Ukrainian ethnicity. When he was 10, his parents moved to Uzbekistan, and he learnt to speak Uzbek. After the Bolshevik Revolution, he joined Komsomol and became a trade union organiser in Bukhara and an engineer, joined the Communist Party in 1926. For most of his career, he was a discreet regional apparatchik in the border republics of the USSR. In 1934-38, he worked in the central party apparatus in Moscow, but received sudden promotion in 1938, as a result of the Great Purge, when he was appointed First Secretary of the communist party in the Buryat-Mongolian Republic. He was subsequently First Secretary in the Bashkir ASSR, in 1944-46, and served in senior party posts in Dagestan, and Uzbekistan. In May or June 1946, he was summoned to Moscow to act as an inspector of party organisations, on the recommendation of Nikolai Patolichev, who had taken over as a party secretary. In March 1947, he was appointed a secretary of the communist party of Belorussia, responsible for agriculture, but was removed early in 1950, and posted to Uzbekistan.

Head of Security 
In December 1950, Ignatyev was recalled to Moscow and appointed head of the department of the Central Committee of the Communist Party of the Soviet Union that supervised party, Komsomol and trade union personnel, and given the task of investigating the Minister of State Security (MGB - forerunner of the KGB), Viktor Abakumov, who had been accused of corruption by a rival, Ivan Serov When Abakumov was dismissed and arrested, in July 1951, Ignatyev was originally appointed representative of the Central Committee in the MGB. On 9 August 1951, he was appointed USSR Minister of State. He was a member of the Central Committee of the Communist Party of the Soviet Union from 1952 until 1961. He also briefly served as a member of the Presidium of the Central Committee (previously named Politburo) in the final months before Stalin's demise.

Ignatyev's first task was to purge the security apparatus. In just over a year, he had 42,000 MGB officers sacked. His tenure as its head coincided with the anti-semitic campaign that began with the arrests of every known Jew employed by the MGB - Lev Shvartzman, Leonid Eitingon, Leonid Raikhman, Andrei Sverdlov, son of Yakov Sverdlov, and many more- and culminated in the infamous Doctors' plot. 

On 5 March 1953, after Stalin's death, Ignatyev was removed from his post in the MGB, as Beria absorbed the MGB into his MVD, and was appointed a Secretary of the Central Committee. In April, it was announced in Pravda and other newspapers that the Doctors' Plot had been a miscarriage of justice and that Ignatyev had been guilty of "political blindness and ignorance" in allowing it to happen.

Role in the Anti-Semitic Purge 
Ignatyev's subordinate, Mikhail Ryumin, was charged with being the main instigator of the Doctors' Plot, for which he was shot, while it was Ignatyev's good fortune to be the first former head of the security services in almost 30 years to escape being arrested and executed - the fate suffered by Genrikh Yagoda, Nikolai Yezhov, Vsevolod Merkulov, Beria and Abakumov. In later life, Ignatyev would claim that he was never really involved in the Doctors' Plot, except to pass messages between Stalin and Ryumin, and that Stalin had repeatedly threatened to have him killed if he did not obey orders. Nikita Khrushchev evidently believed him. In the famous Secret Speech that he delivered in 1956 to the 20th Congress of the Soviet Communist Party, in which he exposed Stain's crimes for the first time, Khrushchev remarked: "Present at this Congress as a delegate is the former Minister of State Security Comrade Ignatyev. Stalin told him curtly, 'If you do not obtain confessions from the doctors we will shorten you by a head'." In his memoirs, Khrushchev claimed: 

By contrast, the former MGB officer, Pavel Sudoplatov, asserted that "at the peak of the anti-semitic campaign, not Ryumin but Mesetsov, Konyatkin and Ignatyev were in charge of the criminal investigation and the beating of the doctors" He described Mesetsov and Konyatkin, who was Ryumin's deputy, as "incompetent". Ryumin was sacked in November 1952, while Ignatyev remained in office, though he collapsed on 14 November 1952 after transmitting a direct order from Stalin that the prisoners were to be tortured. He may have been reluctant to have the instruction carried out, but the historians Jonathan Brent and Vladimir Naumov have noted that "Ignatyev's malaise and exhaustion did not prevent him from slavish obedience." 

Sudoplatov also alleged that Ignatyev planned to carry out assassinations in Germany and Paris of elderly opponents of the Soviet regime, including exiled Mensheviks and a Ukrainian nationalist who "was in this seventies, no longer active, but Ignatyev's group was eager to report his liquidation to impress the government." Other planned targets for assassination allegedly included Josip Broz Tito and Alexander Kerensky.

Later career 
In February 1954, Ignatyev was reappointed to the post of First secretary in the Bashkir republic, which he had held ten years earlier. In June 1957-October 1960, he was head of the communist party in Tatarstan. Tatar historian credit him with having lobbied Moscow in 1958 to bring about a revival of the Tatar language. According to one historian, Rimzil Valeyev "no other party leader cared for the Tatar language and culture as fundamentally and effectively as Ignatyev did in 1957-1960" - partly because no other party official in Tatarstan had Ignatyev's experience of high level politics in Moscow.
 
Ignatyev retired "for health reasons" at the age of 55. He died of natural causes in 1983 and was buried in the Novodevichy Cemetery in Moscow, along with many members of the Soviet elite.

References

External links
A biography of Semyon Ignatyev (in Russian)
Official FSB profile of Semyon Ignatyev (in Russian)

1904 births
1983 deaths
People from Kherson Governorate
People from Yelisavetgradsky Uyezd
Members of the Supreme Soviet of the Russian Soviet Federative Socialist Republic, 1955–1959
Politburo of the Central Committee of the Communist Party of the Soviet Union members
Secretariat of the Central Committee of the Communist Party of the Soviet Union members
First convocation members of the Soviet of the Union
Second convocation members of the Soviet of the Union
Third convocation members of the Soviet of the Union
Fourth convocation members of the Soviet of the Union
Fifth convocation members of the Soviet of the Union
Recipients of the Order of Lenin
Recipients of the Order of the Red Banner of Labour
Burials at Novodevichy Cemetery